D'Anton Lynn (born Anthony Ray Lynn II, October 24, 1989) is the defensive coordinator for the UCLA Bruins of the Pac-12 Conference (NCAA). He previously served as the defensive backs coach for the Baltimore Ravens in 2021 before being elevated in 2022 to safeties coach for the Baltimore Ravens. Lynn was previously the secondary coach for the Houston Texans, and has also been an assistant coach with the Los Angeles Chargers, Buffalo Bills and New York Jets. Lynn played college football at Penn State, where he was a three time All-Big Ten selection as a defensive back, and was signed as an undrafted free agent by the Jets in 2012.

Playing career

High school
Lynn attended Celina High School in Celina, Texas. Lynn also played defensive back, linebacker, quarterback, running back and wide receiver at Celina High School. He was selected for the Associated Press Class 3A first-team all-state.

College
Lynn played four seasons at Penn State. During his tenure in Penn State, Lynn recorded 162 tackles, 7 tackles for loss, 4 interceptions, 1 fumble recovery.

In his junior year, Lynn started every single game at cornerback. He finished the season with 75 tackles, 3 interceptions and 7 passes defensed. On September 11, 2010, he recorded 5 tackles in a loss to No. 1 ranked Alabama by the score of 24-3. The next game on September 18, 2010, he had 2 tackles and an interception against Kent State and Penn State won 24-0. On October 23, 2010, he record 10 tackles, one interception and 2 passes defended against Minnesota and Penn State won 33-21.

In his sophomore year, he won the starting cornerback position. On October 31, 2009, he recorded 8 tackles against Northwestern as Penn State won 34-13.

In his Freshman year, on October 11, 2008, he just had 2 tackles against Wisconsin and Penn State won 48-7.

National Football League

2012 NFL Combine

New York Jets
On April 29, 2012, Lynn signed with New York Jets as an undrafted free agent and reuniting him with his father Anthony Lynn who was at the time the Jets running backs coach. On August 31, 2012, he was released.

Canadian Football League

Hamilton Tiger Cats
On May 24, 2013, Lynn signed with the Hamilton Tiger-Cats of the Canadian Football League. On June 2, 2013, Lynn was released.

Coaching career

New York Jets
In 2014, Lynn served as a seasonal intern for the New York Jets, after serving in the team's scouting department in 2013.

Buffalo Bills
On January 26, 2015, Lynn was hired by the Buffalo Bills as a defensive assistant.

Los Angeles Chargers
On February 2, 2017, Lynn was hired by the Los Angeles Chargers as a defensive assistant.

Houston Texans
On February 7, 2018, Lynn was hired by the Houston Texans as their assistant defensive backs coach under head coach Bill O’Brien. On January 29, 2020, Lynn was promoted to the team's secondary coach.

Baltimore Ravens
On January 24, 2021, Lynn was hired by the Baltimore Ravens as their defensive backs coach under defensive coordinator Don Martindale and head coach John Harbaugh.

On January 20, 2022, Lynn was selected as head coach of the East squad in the 2022 East-West Shrine Bowl held in Las Vegas.

UCLA Bruins
On February 27, 2023, Lynn was hired by UCLA to become their defensive coordinator, replacing Bill McGovern.

Personal life
Lynn is the son of former Los Angeles Chargers head coach, and current San Francisco 49ers assistant head coach, Anthony Lynn.

References

External links
 Penn State bio
 New York Jets bio
 Hamilton Tiger-Cats bio
 Buffalo Bills bio

1989 births
Living people
Sportspeople from Plano, Texas
Players of American football from Texas
American football cornerbacks
Penn State Nittany Lions football players
New York Jets players
Hamilton Tiger-Cats players
Baltimore Ravens coaches
Buffalo Bills coaches
Houston Texans coaches
Los Angeles Chargers coaches
New York Jets coaches